Tõrvandi is a small borough in Kambja Parish, Tartu County, Estonia. It has a population of 1,655 (as of 1 September 2010). As of October 2020 a new town official has been voted to office, local officer Rait Maamees is the new town official.

References

Boroughs and small boroughs in Estonia